This is a list of the rosters of the Pro-continental cycling team, by season.

2020

2019

2018

2017

2016 
Roster in 2016, age as of 1 January 2016:

2015

2014

2013 
As of 1 January 2013.

2012 
As of 2 February 2012.

2011

2010

References

Lists of cyclists by team